Epes Winthrop Sargent  (1872–1938) was an American vaudeville critic, who wrote under the pen-name Chicot. He is considered "one of vaudeville's most influential critics and commentators".

He was born in Nassau, Bahamas on August 21, 1872; he came to the United States in 1878 with his parents. He first worked as a critic for the New York paper, the, Daily Mercury.; in the 1890s, he joined the New York Morning Telegraph.

He claimed to have "criticized the first motion picture offered in a theatre. This was at Keith’s Union Square Theater in 1896, and at that moment he became a film fan."

In 1905, when Variety began publication, he joined them as their first reviewer.  Although he did not work continuously for them,  he wrote for them until his death in Brooklyn, New York on Dec. 6, 1938.

In 1911, he became a staff writer for The Moving Picture World. They serialized his Technique of the Photoplay, which was soon published as a book.

References

External links
 
 

American music critics
People from Nassau, Bahamas
1872 births
1938 deaths